The Boston College–Syracuse football rivalry is an American college football rivalry between the Boston College Eagles and Syracuse Orange.

History
The two schools first met on October 18, 1924. The Eagles and Orange played annually from 1971 to 2004. To date, Boston College and Syracuse have played each other 56 times. Aside from Holy Cross, no team has played Boston College more than Syracuse. Syracuse leads the series 34–22.

Boston College and Syracuse were founding members of the Big East Conference, first as a basketball conference in 1979, then a football conference in 1991.

To start the 2005 season, Boston College left the Big East to become the 12th member of the ACC. The future of the rivalry was in doubt. The Eagles and Orange signed a deal to play a non-conference game through 2021. The Eagles won the 2010 meeting 16–7. In September 2011, the ACC announced that they had accepted bids from Syracuse and Pitt to become the 13th and 14th members of the ACC. It was later determined that Syracuse and Pitt would join the ACC in July 2013.

Game results

Memorable games
In 2004, Boston College was in first place in the Big East and needed a win against then 5–5 Syracuse in the regular season finale to clinch their first BCS bowl berth. With Syracuse's two RB's out with injuries, DB Diamond Ferri filled in as RB. Ferri rushed for 141 yards and 2 TDs. Ferri also had a 44-yard interception return for a TD. Syracuse went on to pull off the shocking blowout upset, winning 43–17. This game was also the first career start by Boston College QB Matt Ryan; he was filling in for the injured Paul Peterson. This was BC's final game as a member of the Big East; they began playing in the ACC in 2005.

In 2013, Syracuse was playing in their first year as a member of the ACC. Syracuse was 5–6 heading into the final game of the season against Boston College, needing to win to become bowl-eligible. Boston College was up 31–27 with 2:08 left when Syracuse drove down the field and scored the game-winning touchdown with 6 seconds left.

The 2018 season was a historic year for both Boston College and Syracuse with the former earning a ranking in the AP poll for the first time since 2008, and the latter the first AP ranking since 2001. About three quarters way through the season, it looked like this could be the year that the Boston College-Syracuse matchup featured two ranked teams. BC was ranked as high as #17 in week 10 but a loss to #2 ranked Clemson dropped them 3 spots in the rankings, and then an upset defeat at the hands of a reeling Florida State team the following week pushed them out of the top 25 entirely. Likewise, in week 11, Syracuse was pummeled 36-3 by #3 Notre Dame and lost their starting quarterback, dropping them down from a peak at #12 to #20.

See also  
 List of NCAA college football rivalry games

References

College football rivalries in the United States
Boston College Eagles football
Syracuse Orange football